Egerton Lee Batchelor (10 April 1865 – 8 October 1911) was an Australian politician and trade unionist. He was a pioneer of the Australian Labor Party (ALP) in South Australia, which at the time was known as the United Labor Party (ULP). He was a member of the South Australian House of Assembly (1893–1901), leading the ULP from 1898 until his resignation in 1899 to accept a ministerial post in a non-Labor government, with the party's approval. Batchelor entered federal politics in 1901 and held cabinet posts in the first three ALP governments. He was Minister for Home Affairs (1904) under Chris Watson, and then served two terms as Minister for External Affairs (1908–1909, 1910–1911) under Andrew Fisher. He suffered a fatal heart attack at the age of 46 while climbing Mount Donna Buang.

Early life
Lee Batchelor was born in Adelaide, South Australia in 1865 and after the early death of his photographer father, he and his two brothers were raised by his mother. Batchelor was educated at the North Adelaide Model School and worked there as a pupil-teacher when he was 12. He also worked at the North Adelaide Church of Christ secondary school but became an apprentice engine-fitter in the government engineering plant in the Adelaide suburb of Islington at 17.

Trade union career
Batchelor soon became active in the labour movement and joined the Amalgamated Society of Engineers (Adelaide) in 1882 and was its president four times between 1889 and 1898. He was also president of the Railway Service Mutual Association. He was elected treasurer of the Trades and Labor Council in 1892 and secretary in 1893. In 1890 he married Rosina Mooney. In 1891, Batchelor was a prominent founding member of the United Labor Party. He was the ULP secretary from 1892 to 1896 and was president in 1898.

Colonial politics

Batchelor was nominated for election to the South Australian House of Assembly on behalf of the ULP in 1893. He gained widespread support from the electorate, and was elected at the top of the poll, becoming one of ten of the first Labor Members of Parliament in South Australia, after John McPherson, the first ULP leader, was elected to East Adelaide in a 1892 by-election. Batchelor also defeated a sitting minister in his seat, and outpolled Charles Kingston, a later Premier of South Australia. When McPherson died in 1897, Batchelor became Labor leader, with the party continuing to support the Kingston liberal government. Thomas Price succeeded Batchelor as Labor leader after the 1899 election (and went on to form the world's first stable Labor government, after the 1905 election). John Verran led Labor to form the state's first of many majority governments at the 1910 election.

Following the fall of the Kingston ministry in December 1899 and the brief premiership of Vaiben Louis Solomon, Batchelor was invited to join Frederick Holder's government as the Minister for Education and Agriculture. As the Minister, Batchelor legislated for a new teacher training scheme coupled with university education. Although the Labor Party pledge of 1899 refused the right of members to join a non-Labor administration, caucus released Batchelor from this constraint: Holder's was essentially the old Kingston ministry with which Labor had associated closely. Batchelor resigned from caucus and from the leadership and became the first Labor member in Australia to join a non-Labor ministry, with the party's unanimous approval.

Federal politics

He retired from the South Australian parliament in 1901 and stood for election to the Parliament of Australia in the first Australian election. Batchelor, along with Holder, was elected to the Australian House of Representatives in the single statewide Division of South Australia. Batchelor was the only Labor member of the seven MPs. Labor candidate Thomas Price finished eighth. After South Australia was divided into electoral divisions for the 1903 election to which Batchelor was assigned the Division of Hindmarsh. Batchelor however unselfishly gave up this seat for one of his state MPs, instead deciding to contest the Division of Boothby against former Premier Vaiben Solomon. The voters of Boothby rewarded this selflessness with his election.

In 1904, Batchelor was the Minister for Home Affairs in the government of Chris Watson. He was a "certain inclusion" in Watson's ministry, and along with Billy Hughes had been counselled Watson in selecting the remainder of the Watson ministry. One of his main responsibilities in the short-lived ministry was for the passage of the Seat of Government Act as to the founding of the new national capital. He was nominated in the leadership contest when Watson retired as inaugural Labor leader in 1907 but declined to stand.

From 1908 to 1909, and again from 1910 to 1911, Batchelor was the Minister for External Affairs under the governments of Andrew Fisher. Batchelor attended the 1911 Imperial Conference along with Fisher, as the leading spokesperson on trade and foreign policy matters.

When the Northern Territory was transferred to the control of the Commonwealth in January 1911, Batchelor was the first minister to be given the responsibility of overseeing the administration of the territory. During this time he worked to create reserves for the Indigenous peoples of the Northern Territory.

Batchelor collapsed and died from a heart attack when climbing Mount Donna Buang in October 1911, at age 46. He was the first serving Minister who was also a member of the parliament to die in office (Sir James Dickson, Minister for Defence, died in January 1901 but he was not a member of parliament). Shortly after his death, in 1912, the town of Batchelor, Northern Territory (which is about 98 kilometres south of Darwin) was named after him.

Sources
 McMullin, R., (2004) So Monstrous a Travesty: Chris Watson and the world’s first national labour government, Scribe Publications: Sydney. .

References 

 

|-

|-

1865 births
1911 deaths
Australian Labor Party members of the Parliament of Australia
Australian ministers for Foreign Affairs
Members of the Australian House of Representatives
Members of the Australian House of Representatives for Boothby
Members of the Cabinet of Australia
20th-century Australian politicians